Roy Reinard  is a former Republican member of the Pennsylvania House of Representatives.

He is a 1973 graduate of Council Rock High School in Newtown, Pennsylvania. He earned a degree from West Chester University in 1977. Prior to elective office, he worked in the insurance industry. He was first elected to represent the 178th legislative district in the Pennsylvania House of Representatives in 1982. He retired prior to the 2002 elections.  He currently serves on the Pennsylvania Higher Education Assistance Agency.

References

External links
 official PA House profile

Living people
Republican Party members of the Pennsylvania House of Representatives
1954 births
West Chester University alumni